Rucker or Rücker is a surname, and may refer to:

 Sir Arthur William Rucker (1848–1915), British physicist
 Benjamin Rucker (1889–1934), African American stage magician
 Darius Rucker (born 1966), American musician (Hootie and the Blowfish and a country solo act)
 Edgar P. Rucker (1861–1908), West Virginia Attorney General
 Edmund Rucker (1835–1924), Confederate officer during the American Civil War
 Frostee Rucker (born 1983), American football defensive end for the Arizona Cardinals
 Gerta Rücker (born 1955), German statistician
 Henry A. Rucker (1852–1924), African American entrepreneur and politician
 Jane Rucker (1830–1907), American pioneer and real estate investor
 Joseph T. Rucker (1887–1957), Academy Award–winning cinematographer
 Martin T. Rucker (born 1957), Democratic member of the Missouri House of Representatives
 Michael Rucker (baseball) (born 1994), American baseball player
 Mike Rucker (born 1975), American football defensive end for the Carolina Panthers
 Nap Rucker (1884–1970), left-handed pitcher in Major League Baseball 
 Patricia Rucker (born 1974), West Virginia state Senator
 Philip Rucker, American journalist
 Reggie Rucker (born 1947), American football player
 Robert D. Rucker (born 1952), Indiana Supreme Court justice
 Rudy Rucker (born 1946), American computer scientist and science fiction author
 Sandra Rucker (born 1987), American figure skater
 Stephen Rucker (born 1949), American television composer
 Steve Rucker (born 1954), drummer for the Bee Gees
 Tinsley W. Rucker Jr. (1848–1926), American politician, soldier and lawyer
 Ursula Rucker, spoken word recording artist

See also
 Ruck (disambiguation), includes list of people with surname Ruck